Hillspeed is a motor racing team based in the United Kingdom. They currently participate in the GB3 Championship and the GB4 Championship.

The team was founded in 1970 in order to run the British Saloon Car Championship entry of Morgan Ollerenshaw. In subsequent years, the team focused primarily on single-seater racing. Later, the company would also be involved in high performance road cars.

In recent years, Hillspeed have been one of the most successful teams in breaking new talent in junior racing series, winning the 2010 Formula Renault BARC season with Alice Powell as well as back-to-back Ginetta Junior championships with Tom Ingram in 2010 and Seb Morris in 2011. They joined the BRDC British Formula 4 Championship when it was founded in 2013. They also stayed in the series when it became the BRDC British Formula 3 Championship in 2016. Recently the series was renamed into GB3 Championship.

Current series results

BRDC Formula 4 Championship / BRDC British Formula 3 Championship / GB3 Championship

GB4 Championship

References

External links
 
 

British auto racing teams
1970 establishments in the United Kingdom
Auto racing teams established in 1970
Sports car racing teams
British Formula Renault teams

British Formula Three teams